The New York metropolitan area, broadly called the Tri-State area, is the largest metropolitan area in the world by urban landmass encompassing  and one of the most populous urban areas in the world. The vast metropolitan area includes New York City, Long Island, the Mid and Lower Hudson Valley in New York state; the six largest cities in New Jersey: Newark, Jersey City, Paterson, Elizabeth, Lakewood, and Edison, and their vicinities; and six of the seven largest cities in Connecticut: Bridgeport, Stamford, New Haven, Waterbury, Norwalk, and Danbury, and the vicinities of these cities. The New York metropolitan area is the geographic and demographic hub of the larger Northeast megalopolis.

The New York metropolitan area metropolitan statistical area in the United States with 20.1 million residents as of 2020. The combined statistical area includes 23.6 million residents as of 2020. The metropolitan area is home to approximately 6% of the U.S. population. It is the tenth largest urban agglomeration in the world. The New York metropolitan area continues to be the premier gateway for legal immigration to the United States, having the largest foreign-born population of any metropolitan region in the world. The New York metropolitan area's population is larger than that of the state of New York, and the metropolitan airspace accommodated over 130 million passengers in 2016.

As the hub of multiple industries, including finance, health care, pharmaceuticals, and life sciences, international trade, publishing, real estate, education, fashion, entertainment, tourism, law, and manufacturing, the New York metropolitan area estimated to produce a gross metropolitan product (GMP) of $2.1 trillion as of 2022, representing the largest metropolitan economy worldwide; and if the New York metropolitan area were an independent sovereign state, it would constitute the eighth-largest economy in the world. It is the most prominent financial, diplomatic, and media hub in the world. 

According to Forbes, in 2014, the New York metropolitan area was home to eight of the top ten ZIP Codes in the United States by median housing price, with six in Manhattan alone. The New York metropolitan area also contains five of the top ten richest places in America, according to Bloomberg. These are Scarsdale, New York; Short Hills, New Jersey; Old Greenwich, Connecticut; Bronxville, New York; and Darien, Connecticut. The New York metropolitan region's higher education network comprises hundreds of colleges and universities, including New York University and three Ivy League universities: Columbia, Princeton, and Yale.

Definitions

Metropolitan statistical area

The counties and county groupings constituting the New York metropolitan area are listed below, with 2010 census figures:

The U.S. Office of Management and Budget utilizes two definitions of the urbanized area: the metropolitan statistical area (MSA) and the combined statistical area (CSA). The MSA definition is titled the New York-Newark-Jersey City, NY-NJ-PA Metropolitan Statistical Area, and includes a population of 20.3 million people by 2017 Census estimates, roughly 1 in 16 Americans and nearly 7 million more than the second-place Los Angeles metropolitan area in the United States. The MSA is further subdivided into four metropolitan divisions. The 23-county MSA includes 10 counties in New York State (coextensive with the five boroughs of New York, the two remaining counties of Long Island, and three counties in the Lower Hudson Valley); 12 counties in Northern and Central New Jersey; and one county in northeastern Pennsylvania. The largest urbanized area in the United States is at the heart of the metropolitan area, the New York–Newark, NY–NJ–CT Urbanized Area (which had a land area of 3,450 square miles in 2010 according to the 2010 census). The New York state portion of the metropolitan area (the Five Boroughs, the lower Hudson Valley, and Long Island) accounts for over 65 percent of the state's population.

New York–Newark–Jersey City, NY–NJ–PA Metropolitan Statistical Area (19,043,386)
 New York–Jersey City–White Plains, NY–NJ Metropolitan Division (11,732,233)
Kings County, NY (the borough of Brooklyn in NYC)
 Queens County, NY (the borough of Queens in NYC)
 New York County, NY (the borough of Manhattan in NYC)
 Bronx County, NY (the borough of The Bronx in NYC)
 Richmond County, NY (the borough of Staten Island in NYC)
 Westchester County, NY
 Bergen County, NJ
 Hudson County, NJ
 Passaic County, NJ
 Putnam County, NY
 Rockland County, NY
 Nassau County–Suffolk County, NY Metropolitan Division (2,832,882)
 Suffolk County, NY
 Nassau County, NY
 New Brunswick-Lakewood, NJ Metropolitan Division (2,383,854) 
 Middlesex County, NJ
 Monmouth County, NJ
 Ocean County, NJ
 Somerset County, NJ
 Newark, NJ–PA Metropolitan Division (2,174,944)
 Essex County, NJ
 Union County, NJ
 Morris County, NJ
 Sussex County, NJ
 Hunterdon County, NJ
 Pike County, PA

Combined statistical area

Combined statistical areas (CSAs) group together adjacent core-based statistical areas with a high degree of economic interconnection. The New York–Newark, NY–NJ–CT–PA Combined Statistical Area had an estimated population of 23.7 million as of 2014. About one out of every fifteen Americans resides in this region, which includes eight additional counties in New York, New Jersey, Connecticut, and Pennsylvania. This area, less the Pennsylvania portion, is often referred to as the tri-state area and less commonly the tri-state region. The New York City television designated market area (DMA) includes Pike County, Pennsylvania, which is also included in the CSA.

In addition to the New York–Newark–Jersey City, NY–NJ–PA metropolitan statistical areas (MSA), the following core-based statistical areas are also included in the New York–Newark, NY–NJ–CT–PA CSA:
 Bridgeport–Stamford–Norwalk–Danbury, CT MSA (916,829)
 Fairfield County
 New Haven–Milford, CT MSA (862,477)
 New Haven County, Connecticut
 Trenton-Princeton, NJ MSA (396,811)
 Mercer County
 Torrington, CT micropolitan statistical area (189,927)
 Litchfield County
 Kingston, NY MSA (182,693)
 Ulster County
 East Stroudsburg, PA MSA (169,842)
 Monroe County, Pennsylvania
 Poughkeepsie–Newburgh–Middletown, NY MSA (670,301)
 Dutchess County
 Orange County, NY

Geography

The area is frequently divided into the following subregions:
 New York City (the primary urban center of the metropolitan region, comprising five boroughs, one of which is Manhattan, the geographical, cultural, and economic core of the entire metropolitan area)
 Central and eastern Long Island (Nassau and Suffolk Counties – separated by water from the rest of the region except New York City; not including Queens County or Kings County (Brooklyn), which are concurrent with two of New York's five boroughs)
 North Jersey (northern portion of New Jersey)
 Central Jersey (middle portion of New Jersey)
 Hudson Valley (Lower Hudson Valley suburbs of Westchester, Putnam, and Rockland Counties; and Mid-Hudson exurbs of Dutchess, Sullivan, Orange, and Ulster Counties)
 Western Connecticut (Only Fairfield, New Haven, and Litchfield Counties are part of the region and separated by the state line)
 Southern and Eastern Poconos (Monroe and Pike Counties in Pennsylvania)

All eight subregions are often further subdivided. For instance, Long Island can be divided into its South and North Shores (usually when speaking about Nassau County and western Suffolk County) and the East End. The Hudson Valley and Connecticut are sometimes grouped together and referred to as the Northern Suburbs, largely because of the shared usage of the Metro-North Railroad system.

Climate
Under the Köppen climate classification, New York City, western (and parts of eastern) Long Island, and the Jersey Shore experience a humid subtropical climate (Cfa), and New York is thus the northernmost major city on the North American continent with this climate type.

Much of Monroe and most of Pike County in Pennsylvania also have a fully humid continental climate.

Summers in the area are typically hot and humid. Nighttime conditions in and around the five boroughs of New York are often exacerbated by the urban heat island phenomenon, and temperatures exceed  on average of 7–8 days (on the immediate Long Island Sound and Atlantic coasts), up to in excess of 27 days (inland suburbs in New Jersey) each summer and may exceed .. Normally, warm to hot temperatures begin in mid May, and last through early October. Summers also feature passing thundershowers which build in the heat of the day, then drop brief, but intense rainfall.

Winters are cold with a mix of rain and snow. Although prevailing winds in winter are offshore, and temper the moderating effects of the Atlantic Ocean, the Atlantic and the partial shielding by the Appalachians from colder air keep the New York area warmer in the winter than inland North American metropolitan areas located at similar or lesser latitudes including Pittsburgh, Cincinnati, and Indianapolis. Warm periods with + temperatures may occasionally occur during winter as well. The hardiness zone in the New York metropolitan area varies over a wide range from 5a in the highest areas of Dutchess, Monroe, and Ulster Counties to 7b in most of NYC as well as Hudson County from Bayonne up the east side of the Palisades to Route 495, the majority of Nassau County, the north coast of Monmouth County, and Copiague Harbor, Lindenhurst, and Montauk in Suffolk County. 

Hurricanes and tropical storms have impacted the Tri-State area in the past, though a direct hit is rare. Several areas on Long Island, New Jersey, and the Connecticut coast have been impacted by serious storm surges in the past. Inland areas have been impacted by heavy rain and flooding from tropical cyclones.

The New York metropolitan area averages 234 days with at least some sunshine and 59% of possible sunlight annually, accumulating 2,400 to 2,800 hours of sunshine per annum.

Subregions

New York City 

The geographical, cultural, and economic center of the metropolitan area is New York City, the most populous city in the United States and has been described as the capital of the world. The city consists of five boroughs, each of which is coterminous with a county of New York State. The five boroughs – Brooklyn, Queens, Manhattan, the Bronx, and Staten Island – were consolidated into a single city in 1898. With a Census-estimated population of 8,550,405 in 2015 (8,491,079 in 2014), distributed over a land area of just , New York is the most densely populated major city in the United States. A global power city, New York City exerts a significant impact upon commerce, finance, health care and life sciences, media, dining, art, fashion, research, technology, education, and entertainment, its fast pace defining the term New York minute. Home to the headquarters of the United Nations, New York is an important center for international diplomacy. New York is a global city and has been described as the cultural, financial, entertainment, and media capital of the world, as well as the world's most economically powerful city.

Long Island 

Long Island, the most populous island in the United States, is located just off the northeast coast of the United States and is a region wholly included within both the U.S. state of New York and the New York metropolitan area. Extending 118 miles east-northeast of Roosevelt Island, Manhattan from New York Harbor into the Atlantic Ocean, the island comprises four counties: Kings and Queens (these form the New York boroughs of Brooklyn and Queens, respectively) to the west; then Nassau and Suffolk to the east. However, most people in the New York metropolitan area (even those living in Queens and Brooklyn) colloquially use the term "Long Island" (or "The Island") exclusively to refer to the Nassau-Suffolk county area collectively, which is mainly suburban in character. North of the island is Long Island Sound, across which are the U.S. states of Connecticut and Rhode Island.

With a population of 8,063,232 enumerated at the 2020 U.S. Census, constituting nearly 40% of New York State's population, the majority of New York City residents, 58.4% as of 2020, live on Long Island, namely the estimated 4,896,398 residents living in the New York City boroughs of Brooklyn and Queens. Long Island is the most populated island in any U.S. state or territory, and the 17th-most populous island in the world (ahead of Ireland, Jamaica, and Hokkaidō). If Long Island geographically constituted an independent metropolitan statistical area, it would rank fourth most populous in the United States; while if it were a U.S. state, Long Island would rank 13th in population and first in population density. Queens is the most ethnically diverse urban area in the world. The Town of Hempstead in Nassau County, with an estimated population of 770,367 in 2016, is the most populous municipality in the New York metropolitan area outside of New York City.

Long Island is also the 17th most populous island in the world, but is more prominently known for recreation, boating, and miles of public beaches, including numerous town, county, and state parks, as well as Fire Island National Seashore and wealthy and expensive coastal residential enclaves. Along the north shore, the Gold Coast of Long Island, featured in the film The Great Gatsby, is an upscale section of Nassau and western Suffolk counties that once featured many lavish mansions built and inhabited by wealthy business tycoons in the earlier years of the 20th century, of which only a few remain preserved as historic sites. The East End of Long Island (known as the "Twin Forks" because of its physical shape) boasts open spaces for farmland and wineries. The South Fork, in particular, comprises numerous towns and villages known collectively as "The Hamptons" and has an international reputation as a "playground for the rich and famous", with some of the wealthiest communities in the United States. In 2015, according to Business Insider, the 11962 zip code encompassing Sagaponack, within Southampton, was listed as the most expensive in the U.S. by real estate-listings site Property Shark, with a median home sale price of $5,125,000.
During the summer season, many celebrities and the wealthy visit or reside in mansions and waterfront homes, while others spend weekends enjoying the beaches, gardens, bars, restaurants, and nightclubs.

Long Island is served by a network of parkways and expressways, with the Long Island Expressway, Northern State Parkway, and Southern State Parkway being major east–west routes across significant portions of the island. Commuter rail access is provided by the Metropolitan Transportation Authority (MTA) Long Island Rail Road, one of the largest commuter railroads in the United States. Air travel needs are served by several airports. Within Queens, the island is home to John F. Kennedy International Airport and LaGuardia Airport, two of the three major airline hubs serving the New York area (with Newark Liberty International Airport being the third; all three major airports are operated by The Port Authority of New York & New Jersey). Long Island MacArthur Airport (serving commercial airlines) and Farmingdale/Republic Airport (private and commuter flights) are both located in Suffolk County.

Lower Hudson Valley 

Known for its hilly terrain, picturesque settings, and quaint small towns and villages, the Lower Hudson Valley is centered around the Hudson River north of New York City and lies within New York State. Westchester and Putnam counties are located on the eastern side of the river, and Rockland and Orange counties are located on the western side of the river. Westchester and Rockland counties are connected by the heavily trafficked New Tappan Zee Bridge, as well as by the Bear Mountain Bridge near their northern ends. Several branches of the MTA Metro-North Railroad serve the region's rail commuters. Southern Westchester County contains more densely populated areas and includes the cities of Yonkers, Mount Vernon, New Rochelle, and White Plains. Although many of the suburban communities of Westchester are known for their affluence and expense (some examples: Bronxville, Scarsdale, Chappaqua, Armonk, Katonah, and Briarcliff Manor), the Lower Hudson Valley as a whole is one of the fastest-growing areas in the metropolitan area because of high housing costs in New York and the inner suburbs.

Historically, the valley was home to many factories, including paper mills, but a significant number have closed. After years of lingering pollution, cleanup efforts to improve the Hudson River water quality are currently planned and will be supervised by the United States Environmental Protection Agency (EPA).

Mid-Hudson Valley 
The Mid-Hudson Valley region of the State of New York is midway between New York City and the state capital of Albany. The area includes the counties of Dutchess, Ulster, and Sullivan, as well as the northern portions of Orange County, with the region's main cities being Poughkeepsie, Newburgh, Kingston, and Beacon. The Walkway over the Hudson, is the second longest pedestrian footbridge in the world. It crosses the Hudson River connecting Poughkeepsie and Highland. The 13 mile-long Dutchess Rail Trail stretches from Hopewell Junction to the beginning of the Walkway over the Hudson in Poughkeepsie. The area is home to the Wappingers Central School District, which the second-largest school district in the state of New York. The Newburgh Waterfront in the City of Newburgh is home to many high-end restaurants.

U.S. Route 9, I-84, and the Taconic State Parkway all run through Dutchess County. Metro-North Railroad train station, New Hamburg, is located in the Town of Poughkeepsie and runs from Poughkeepsie to Grand Central Terminal in New York City.

Northern New Jersey 

Northern New Jersey, also known colloquially as North Jersey, is typically defined as comprising the following counties:
 Bergen County
 Essex County
 Somerset County  (anything north of Bridgewater Township)
 Hudson County
 Hunterdon County (anything north of Readington Township)
 Morris County
 Passaic County
 Sussex County
 Union County
 Warren County

The New Jersey State Department of Tourism splits North Jersey into the urban Gateway Region and the more rural Skylands Region. Northern New Jersey is home to four of the largest cities of that state: Newark, Jersey City, Paterson, and Elizabeth.

The region is geographically diverse with wetlands, mountains, and valleys throughout the area. It has a large network of expressways and public transportation rail services, mostly operated by New Jersey Transit. Northern New Jersey also contains the second busiest airport in the New York metropolitan area, Newark Liberty International Airport.

Although it is a suburban and rural region of New York, much of the Gateway Region is highly urbanized. The entirety of Hudson County, eastern Essex County, southern Passaic County as well as Elizabeth in Union County are all densely populated areas.

Central New Jersey 

Central Jersey is the middle portion of the state of New Jersey. Municipalities including Trenton (the state capital of New Jersey and the only U.S. state capital within the New York metropolitan area) and Princeton (home to Princeton University) are located in this subregion, as is a significant portion of the Jersey Shore.
 Middlesex County
 Mercer County
 Monmouth County
 Ocean County (sometimes considered part of South Jersey)
 Union County
 Hunterdon County (anything south of Readington Township)
 Somerset County (anything south of Bridgewater Township)

Western Connecticut 

Fairfield, New Haven, and Litchfield counties in western Connecticut (like the state in general) are known for affluence. Large businesses are scattered throughout the area, mostly in Fairfield County. The land is flat along the coast with low hills eventually giving way to larger hills such as The Berkshires further inland, to the Massachusetts border. Most of the largest cities in the state are in New Haven County (home to Yale University) and Fairfield County.

Candlewood Lake is the largest recreational lake in the New York metropolitan area. The lake is located within the Greater Danbury region, and is home to many second homes of New York City residents.

Pike County, Pennsylvania 

Pike County is located in northeastern Pennsylvania. As of the 2010 Census, the population was 57,369. Its county seat is Milford. Part of the Pocono Mountains region lies within Pike County, which has ranked among the fastest-growing counties of Pennsylvania.

Communities

Main cities and towns
The following is a list of "principal cities" and their respective population estimates from the 2010 U.S. Census Bureau publication. Principal cities are generally those where there is a greater number of jobs than employed residents.
 New York–Northern New Jersey–Long Island MSA
 New York City: 8,175,133
 Hempstead, New York: 759,757
 Brookhaven, New York: 486,040
 Islip, New York: 335,543
 Oyster Bay, New York: 293,214
 Newark, New Jersey: 277,140
 Jersey City, New Jersey: 247,597
 North Hempstead, New York: 226,322
 Babylon, New York: 213,603
 Huntington, New York: 203,264
 Yonkers, New York: 195,976
 Paterson, New Jersey: 146,199
 Elizabeth, New Jersey: 128,640
 Ramapo, New York: 126,595
 Smithtown, New York: 117,801
 Edison, New Jersey: 99,967
 Woodbridge Township, New Jersey: 99,265
 New Rochelle, New York: 77,062
 Mount Vernon, New York: 67,292
 White Plains, New York: 56,853
 Passaic, New Jersey: 72,500
 Union, New Jersey: 56,642
 Wayne, New Jersey: 54,717
 Trenton–Princeton MSA
 Trenton, New Jersey: 84,913
 Princeton, New Jersey: 28,572
 Bridgeport–Stamford–Norwalk–Danbury MSA
 Bridgeport, Connecticut: 144,229
 Stamford, Connecticut: 122,643
 Norwalk, Connecticut: 85,603
 Danbury, Connecticut: 80,893
 Stratford, Connecticut: 51,384
 New Haven–Milford MSA
 New Haven, Connecticut: 129,779
 Waterbury, Connecticut: 109,272
 Milford, Connecticut: 51,271
 Poughkeepsie–Newburgh–Middletown MSA
 Poughkeepsie, New York: 32,736
 Newburgh, New York: 28,866
 Middletown, New York: 28,086
 Kingston MSA
 Kingston, New York: 23,893
 Torrington Micropolitan Area
 Torrington, Connecticut: 36,383

Urban areas within
At the core of the New York combined statistical area (CSA) lies the New York–Jersey City–Newark, NY–NJ urban area, the largest in the United States by both area and population. Within the boundaries of the CSA the Census Bureau defines 32 other urban areas as well, some forming the core of their own metropolitan areas not within the New York metropolitan statistical area. Urban areas situated primarily outside the New York metropolitan statistical area but within the CSA are identified with a cross (†).

History

During the Wisconsinan glaciation, the region was situated at the edge of a large ice sheet over 1,000 feet in depth. The ice sheet scraped away large amounts of soil, leaving the bedrock that serves as the geologic foundation for much of the New York metropolitan region today. Later on, the ice sheet would help split apart what are now Long Island and Staten Island.

At the time of European contact the region was inhabited by Native Americans, predominantly the Lenape, and others. The Native Americans used the abundant waterways in the area for many purposes, such as fishing and trade routes. Sailing for France in 1524, Giovanni da Verrazzano was the first European to enter the local waters and encounter the residents, but he did not make landfall. Henry Hudson, sailing for the Dutch in 1609, visited the area and built a settlement on Lower Manhattan Island that was eventually renamed New Amsterdam by Dutch colonists in 1626. In 1664, the area went under English control, and was later renamed New York after King Charles II of England granted the lands to his brother, the Duke of York.

As the fur trade expanded further north, New York became a trading hub, which brought in a diverse set of ethnic groups including Africans, Jews, and Portuguese. The island of Manhattan had an extraordinary natural harbor formed by New York Bay (actually the drowned lower river valley of the Hudson River, enclosed by glacial moraines), the East River (actually a tidal strait), and the Hudson River, all of which merge at the southern tip, from which all later development spread. During the American Revolution, the strategic waterways made New York vitally important as a wartime base for the British navy. Many battles such as the Battle of Long Island and the Battle of New York were fought in the region to secure it. New York was captured by the British early in the war, becoming a haven for Loyalist refugees from other parts of the country, and remained in the hands of the British until the war ended in 1783. New York served as the capital of the United States from 1785 until 1790, after which the capital moved to Philadelphia. New York has been the country's largest city since 1790. In 1792, the Buttonwood Agreement, made by a group of merchants, created what is now the New York Stock Exchange in Lower Manhattan. Today, many people in the metropolitan area work in this important stock exchange.

The Statue of Liberty in New York Harbor greeted millions of immigrants as they came to America by ship in the late 19th and early 20th centuries and is a globally recognized symbol of the United States and its democracy. Large-scale immigration into New York was a result of a large demand for manpower. A cosmopolitan attitude in the city created tolerance for various cultures and ethnic groups. German, Irish, and Italian immigrants were among the largest ethnic groups. Today, many of their descendants continue to live in the region. Cultural buildings such as the Metropolitan Museum of Art, the Metropolitan Opera, and the American Museum of Natural History were built. New York newspapers were read around the country as media moguls James Gordon Bennett, Sr., Joseph Pulitzer and William Randolph Hearst battled for readership. In 1884, over 70% of exports passed through ports in New York or in one of the surrounding towns. The five boroughs of New York — The Bronx, Brooklyn, Manhattan, Queens, and Staten Island — were consolidated into a single city in 1898.

The newly unified New York City encouraged both more physical connections between the boroughs and the growth of bedroom communities. The New York City Subway began operating in 1904 as the Interborough Rapid Transit Company, one of three systems (the other two being the Brooklyn-Manhattan Transit Corporation and the Independent Subway System) that were later taken over by the city. Railroad stations such as Grand Central Terminal and Pennsylvania Station helped fuel suburban growth. During the era of the Prohibition, when alcohol was banned nationwide, organized crime grew to supply the high demand for bootleg alcohol. The Broadway Theater District developed with the showing of the musical, Show Boat.

The Great Depression suspended the region's fortunes as a period of widespread unemployment and poverty began. City planner Robert Moses began his automobile-centered career of building bridges, parkways, and later expressways. During World War II, the city economy was hurt by blockades of German U-boats, which limited shipping with Europe.

After its population peaked in 1950, much of the city's population left for the suburbs of New York over the following decades. The effects were a result of white flight. Industry and commerce also declined in this era, with businesses leaving for the suburbs and other cities. The city, particularly Brooklyn, was dealt a psychological as well as an economic blow with the loss of the iconic Brooklyn Dodgers major-league baseball team, which moved to Los Angeles after the 1957 season.  Crime affected the city severely. Urban renewal projects alleviated the decay in Midtown Manhattan to a certain extent, but later failed. There was little reported social disruption during the Northeast Blackout of 1965, but the New York City Blackout of 1977 caused massive rioting in some parts of the city. A rare highlight was the completion of the former World Trade Center, which once stood as the tallest buildings in the world.

In the 1980s, the city's economy was booming. Wall Street was fueling an economic surge in the real estate market. Despite this, crime was still an issue. Beginning in the 1990s, however, crime dropped substantially. Crime in New York City has continued to decline through the 21st century.

A major event in the region's and the nation's history was the September 11th attacks in 2001, which killed nearly 3,000 people as two planes crashed into the former World Trade Center and caused the towers to collapse. Businesses led an exodus from Lower Manhattan because of this but were replaced by an increased number of high-rise residences. In 2003, another blackout occurred, the 2003 North America blackout, but the city suffered no looting and a building boom in New York continues to this day.

On October 29 and 30, 2012, Hurricane Sandy caused extensive destruction in the metropolitan area, ravaging portions of the Atlantic coastline with record-high storm surge, severe flooding, and high winds, causing power outages for millions of residents via downed trees and power lines and malfunctions at electrical substations, leading to gasoline shortages and snarling mass transit systems. Damage to New York and New Jersey in terms of physical infrastructure and private property as well as including interrupted commerce was estimated at several tens of billions of dollars. The storm and its profound impacts have prompted the discussion of constructing seawalls and other coastal barriers around the shorelines of the metropolitan area to minimize the risk of destructive consequences from another such event in the future.

Statistical history
The U.S. Census Bureau first designated metropolitan areas in 1950 as standard metropolitan areas (SMAs). The "New York–Northeastern NJ SMA" was defined to include 17 counties: 9 in New York (the five boroughs of New York City, Nassau, Suffolk, Westchester, and Rockland) and 8 in New Jersey (Bergen, Hudson, Passaic, Essex, Union, Morris, Somerset, and Middlesex). In 1960, the metropolitan area standards were modified and renamed standard metropolitan statistical areas (SMSAs). The new standards resulted in the splitting of the former SMA into several pieces: the nine New York counties became the "New York SMSA"; three of the New Jersey counties (Essex, Union, and Morris) became the "Newark SMSA"; two other New Jersey counties (Bergen and Passaic) became the "Paterson–Passaic–Clifton SMSA"; Hudson County was designated the "Jersey City SMSA"; and Middlesex and Somerset counties lost their metropolitan status. In 1973, a new set of metropolitan area standards resulted in further changes: Nassau and Suffolk counties were split off as their own SMSA ("Nassau–Suffolk SMSA"); Bergen County (originally part of the Paterson–Clifton–Passaic SMSA) was transferred to the New York SMSA; the New York SMSA also received Putnam County (previously non-metropolitan); Somerset County was added to the Newark SMSA; and two new SMSAs, the "New Brunswick–Perth Amboy–Sayreville SMSA" (Middlesex County) and "Long Branch–Asbury Park SMSA" (Monmouth County), were established. In 1983, the concept of a consolidated metropolitan statistical area (CMSA) was first implemented. A CMSA consisted of several primary metropolitan statistical areas (PMSAs), which were individual employment centers within a wider labor market area. The "New York–Northern New Jersey–Long Island CMSA" consisted of 12 PMSAs.

Seven PMSAs were based on the original 1950 New York SMA that were split up: New York, Bergen–Passaic, Jersey City, Middlesex–Somerset–Hunterdon (Hunterdon added for the first time), Monmouth–Ocean (Ocean added for the first time), Nassau–Suffolk, and Newark (Sussex added for the first time). One additional PMSA was the Orange County PMSA (previously the Newburgh–Middletown SMSA). The other four PMSAs were former SMSAs in Connecticut: Bridgeport, Stamford, Norwalk, and Danbury. In 1993, four PMSAs were added to the New York–Northern New Jersey–Long Island CMSA: Trenton PMSA (Mercer County), Dutchess County PMSA, Waterbury PMSA, and New Haven PMSA. Several new counties were also added to the CMSA: Sussex, Warren, and Pike. The CMSA model was originally utilized for tabulating data from the 2000 census. In 2003, a new set of standards was established using the Core Based Statistical Area (CBSA) model was adopted and remains in use as of 2010. The CBSA model resulted in the splitting up of the old CMSA into several metropolitan statistical areas: New York–Northern New Jersey–Long Island, Poughkeepsie–Newburgh–Middletown, Trenton–Princeton, Bridgeport–Stamford–Norwalk (includes Danbury), and New Haven–Milford (includes Waterbury). In 2013, the Census Bureau added Carbon, Lehigh, Northampton, and Monroe counties in Pennsylvania, and Warren County, New Jersey (encompassing collectively the Allentown-Bethlehem-Easton, PA-NJ MSA and the East Stroudsburg, PA MSA), to the Combined Statistical Area, and assimilated Poughkeepsie–Newburgh–Middletown into the larger New York–Northern New Jersey–Long Island–NY–NJ–PA MSA. In 2018, the Allentown-Bethlehem-Easton, PA-NJ MSA was removed from the Combined Statistical Area.

Proposals for the region

The metropolitan region has never had separate political representation from the rest of their original states. This has to do with disagreements in the desired model and the constitutional complexity of the metropolitan region being cross-state. Within the State of New York over the last 30 years, discussions have emerged of splitting the states into different regions with separate governors and legislators whilst remaining part of the same state — as opposed to seeing New York and its metropolitan area being split into a separate state. The idea has been seen by Republicans in the state as an opportunity to dislocate the Democratic party's hold in the state legislature.

The discussion surrounding the re-organisation of New York State has commonly been in two models: The two-region model creates a "downstate" New York region which would consist of all five New York City boroughs, Long Island's Nassau and Suffolk counties, and Westchester and Rockland counties, then Upstate would be the remaining 53; and the three-region model is New York having five counties; Montauk would consist of Nassau, Suffolk, Rockland, and Westchester counties and; New Amsterdam would be the remaining portion of New York State. This debate was reported as recent as February 2019, when Republican state Senator Daphne Jordan supported the state being split into two states, however it was believed that the proposal would require an act of congress for it to be passed.

Demographics

2020 Census

2010 Census

As of the 2010 Census, the metropolitan area had a population of 22,085,649. The population density was 1,865 per square mile. The racial markup was 51.7% White (non-Latino), 21.7% Latino, 15.3% African-American, 9.0% Asian-American, 0.16% Native American and Alaskan Native, 0.03% Pacific Islands American, 0.5% Other, and 1.6% Multiracial.

The median age was 37.9. 25.5% were under 18, 9.5% were 18 to 24 years, 28% were 25 to 44 years of age, 26.6% were 45 to 64 years old, and 13.2% were over the age of 65. Males composed 48.3% of the population while females were 51.7% of the population.

97.7% of the population were in households, 2.3% were in group quarters, and 1% were institutionalized. There were 8,103,731 households, of which 30.2% or 2,449,343 had children. 46.1% or 3,736,165 were composed of opposite sex and married couples. Male households with no wife composed 4.9% or 400,534. 15.0% or 1,212,436 were female households with no husbands. 34% or 2,754,596 were non-family households. The household density was 684 per square mile. 91.9% of housing units were occupied with a 3.8% vacancy rate. The average household size was 2.65 per household. The average income for non-family households was $90,335, and the average income for families was $104,715. 13.3% or 2,888,493 of the population were below the poverty line.

26.7% or 5,911,993 of the population were born outside the United States. Out of this, most (50.6% or 2,992,639) were born in Latin America, 27.0% or 1,595,523 were born in Asia, 17.4% or 1,028,506 were born in Europe, 3.8% or 224,109 were born in Africa, and 0.2% or 11,957 were born in Oceania.

Population estimates
As of 2020, the United States Census Bureau estimated the population of the New York combined statistical area at 23,582,649, the most populous in the United States and one of the world’s most populous urban agglomerations. The increase in the population of the combined statistical area was distributed across the portions of the states of New York, New Jersey, Connecticut, and Pennsylvania which together constitute the greater New York City metropolitan area.

The New York metropolitan region is ethnically diverse. Asian Americans in New York City, according to the 2010 Census, number more than one million, greater than the combined totals of San Francisco and Los Angeles. New York contains the highest total Asian population of any U.S. city proper. The New York borough of Queens is home to the state's largest Asian American population and the largest Andean (Colombian, Ecuadorian, Peruvian, Chilean and Bolivian) populations in the United States, and is also the most ethnically diverse urban area in the world. The Han Chinese population constitutes the fastest-growing ethnicity in New York State; multiple satellites of the original Manhattan Chinatown, in Brooklyn, and around Flushing, Queens, are thriving as traditionally urban enclaves, while also expanding rapidly eastward into suburban Nassau County. on Long Island, as the New York metropolitan region and New York State have become the top destinations for new Chinese immigrants, respectively, and large-scale Chinese immigration continues into New York City and surrounding areas. In 2012, 6.3% of New York was of Chinese ethnicity, with nearly three-fourths living in either Queens or Brooklyn, geographically on Long Island. In particular, the New York area has over 100,000 Fuzhounese people. A community numbering 20,000 Korean-Chinese (Chaoxianzu or Joseonjok) is centered in Flushing, Queens, while New York is also home to the largest Tibetan population outside China, India, and Nepal, also centered in Queens. Koreans made up 1.2% of the city's population, and Japanese 0.3%. Filipinos were the largest Southeast Asian ethnic group at 0.8%, followed by Vietnamese, who made up 0.2% of New York's population in 2010. Indians are the largest South Asian group, comprising 2.4% of the city's population, with Bangladeshis and Pakistanis at 0.7% and 0.5%, respectively. Queens is the preferred borough of settlement for Asian Indians, Koreans, and Filipinos, as well as Malaysians and other Southeast Asians; while Brooklyn is receiving large numbers of both West Indian as well as Asian Indian immigrants.

New York has the largest European and non-Hispanic white population of any American city. At 2.7 million in 2012, New York's non-Hispanic white population is larger than the non-Hispanic white populations of Los Angeles (1.1 million), Chicago (865,000), and Houston (550,000) combined. The European diaspora residing in the city is very diverse. According to 2012 Census estimates, there were roughly 560,000 Italian Americans, 385,000 Irish Americans, 253,000 German Americans, 223,000 Russian Americans, 201,000 Polish Americans, and 137,000 English Americans. Additionally, Greek and French Americans numbered 65,000 each, with those of Hungarian descent estimated at 60,000 people. Ukrainian and Scottish Americans numbered 55,000 and 35,000, respectively. People identifying ancestry from Spain numbered 30,838 total in 2010. People of Norwegian and Swedish descent both stood at about 20,000 each, while people of Czech, Lithuanian, Portuguese, Scotch-Irish, and Welsh descent all numbered between 12,000 and 14,000 people. Arab Americans number over 160,000 in New York City, with the highest concentration in Brooklyn. Central Asians, primarily Uzbek Americans, are a rapidly growing segment of the city's non-Hispanic white population, enumerating over 30,000, and including over half of all Central Asian immigrants to the United States, most settling in Queens or Brooklyn. Albanian Americans are most highly concentrated in the Bronx.

The wider New York metropolitan area is also ethnically diverse. The New York region continues to be by far the leading metropolitan gateway for legal immigrants admitted into the United States, substantially exceeding the combined totals of Los Angeles and Miami, the next most popular gateway regions. It is home to the largest Jewish as well as Israeli communities outside Israel, with the Jewish population in the region numbering over 1.5 million in 2012 and including many diverse Jewish sects from around the Middle East and Eastern Europe. The metropolitan area is also home to 20% of the nation's Indian Americans and at least 20 Little India enclaves, as well as 15% of all Korean Americans and four Koreatowns; the largest Asian Indian population in the Western Hemisphere; the largest Russian American, Italian American, and African American populations; the largest Dominican American, Puerto Rican American, and South American and second-largest overall Hispanic population in the United States, numbering 4.8 million; and includes at least 6 established Chinatowns within New York City alone, with the urban agglomeration comprising a population of 819,527 uniracial overseas Chinese as of 2014 Census estimates, the largest outside of Asia.

Ecuador, Colombia, Guyana, Peru, and Brazil were the top source countries from South America for legal immigrants to the New York region in 2013; the Dominican Republic, Jamaica, Haiti, and Trinidad and Tobago in the Caribbean; Egypt, Ghana, and Nigeria from Africa; and El Salvador, Honduras, and Guatemala in Central America. Amidst a resurgence of Puerto Rican migration to New York City, this population had increased to approximately 1.3 million in the metropolitan area as of 2013.

New York City has been described as the gay capital of the world, and is home to one of the world’s largest LGBTQ populations and the most prominent. The New York metropolitan area is home to a self-identifying gay and bisexual community estimated at 568,903 individuals, the largest in the United States and one of the world's largest. Same-sex marriages in New York were legalized on June 24, 2011, and were authorized to take place beginning 30 days thereafter. The annual New York City Pride March (or gay pride parade) traverses southward down Fifth Avenue in Manhattan, ending at Greenwich Village, and is the largest pride parade in the world, attracting tens of thousands of participants and millions of sidewalk spectators each June.

Religion

The 2014 Pew Religious Landscape Survey showed that the religious makeup of the New York metro area was as follows:

Economy

The New York City regional economy is the largest in the world, with a GDP of US$2.1trillion in 2022, which would rank eighth among sovereign countries. Many Fortune 500 corporations are headquartered in New York, as are a large number of foreign corporations. One out of ten private sector jobs in the city is with a foreign company. In 2012 and 2015, New York topped the first and second Global Economic Power Index lists, respectively, as published by The Atlantic, with cities ranked according to criteria reflecting their presence on five different lists as published by five separate entities. Finance, international trade, new and traditional media, real estate, education, fashion and entertainment, tourism, biotechnology, and manufacturing are the leading industries in the area. Along with its wealth, the area has a cost of living that is the highest in the United States.

Wall Street

New York's most important economic sector lies in its role as the headquarters for the U.S. financial industry, metonymously known as Wall Street. Anchored by Wall Street, in the Financial District of Lower Manhattan, New York has been called both the most economically powerful city and the leading financial center of the world, and the city is home to the world's two largest stock exchanges by total market capitalization, the New York Stock Exchange and NASDAQ. The city's securities industry, enumerating 163,400 jobs in August 2013, continues to form the largest segment of the city's financial sector and an important economic engine, accounting in 2012 for 5 percent of the city's private sector jobs, 8.5 percent (US$3.8 billion) of its tax revenue, and 22 percent of the city's total wages, including an average salary of US$360,700.

Manhattan had approximately 520 million square feet (48.1 million m2) of office space in 2013, making it the largest office market in the United States, while Midtown Manhattan is the largest central business district in the nation.

Lower Manhattan is the third largest central business district in the United States and is home to both the New York Stock Exchange, on Wall Street, and the NASDAQ, at 165 Broadway, representing the world's largest and second largest stock exchanges, respectively, when measured both by overall average daily trading volume and by total market capitalization of their listed companies in 2013. Wall Street investment banking fees in 2012 totaled approximately US$40 billion, while in 2013, senior New York bank officers who manage risk and compliance functions earned as much as US$324,000 annually.

In July 2013, NYSE Euronext, the operator of the New York Stock Exchange, took over the administration of the London interbank offered rate from the British Bankers Association.

Many Wall Street firms have added or moved auxiliary financial or technical operations into Jersey City, to take advantage of New Jersey's relatively lower commercial real estate and rental prices, while offering continued geographic proximity to Manhattan's financial industry ecosystem.

Tech and biotech

Silicon Alley, centered in New York, has evolved into a metonym for the sphere encompassing the metropolitan region's high technology industries involving the internet, new media, financial technology (fintech) and cryptocurrency, telecommunications, digital media, software development, biotechnology, game design, and other fields within information technology that are supported by its entrepreneurship ecosystem and venture capital investments.  High technology startup companies and employment are growing in New York and across the metropolitan region, bolstered by the city's emergence as a global node of creativity and entrepreneurship, social tolerance, and environmental sustainability, as well as New York's position as the leading Internet hub and telecommunications center in North America, including its vicinity to several transatlantic fiber optic trunk lines, the city's intellectual capital, and its extensive outdoor wireless connectivity. Verizon Communications, headquartered at 140 West Street in Lower Manhattan, was at the final stages in 2014 of completing a US$3 billion fiberoptic telecommunications upgrade throughout New York City.

The biotechnology sector is also growing in the New York metropolitan region, based upon its strength in academic scientific research and public and commercial financial support. On December 19, 2011, then-New York mayor Michael Bloomberg announced his choice of Cornell University and Technion-Israel Institute of Technology to build Cornell Tech, a US$2 billion graduate school of applied sciences on Roosevelt Island, Manhattan with the goal of transforming New York into the world's premier technology capital. The New York City Economic Development Corporation's Early Stage Life Sciences Funding Initiative and venture capital partners, including Celgene, General Electric Ventures, and Eli Lilly, committed a minimum of US$100 million to help launch 15 to 20 ventures in life sciences and biotechnology. Westchester County has also developed a burgeoning biotechnology sector in the 21st century, with over US$1 billion in planned private investment as of 2016, earning the county the nickname Biochester.

Port of New York and New Jersey

The Port of New York and New Jersey is the port district of the New York metropolitan area, encompassing the region within approximately a  radius of the Statue of Liberty National Monument. A major economic engine for the New York metropolitan area, the port includes the system of navigable waterways in the estuary along  of shoreline in the vicinity of New York and the Gateway Region of northeastern New Jersey, as well as the region's airports and supporting rail and roadway distribution networks. The Port of New York and New Jersey handled a maritime cargo volume in the ten months through October 2022 of over 8.2 million TEUs, benefitting post-Panamax from the expansion of the Panama Canal, and accelerating ahead of California seaports in monthly cargo volumes.

Water purity and availability

Water purity and availability are a lifeline for the New York metropolitan region. New York City is supplied with drinking water by the protected Catskill Mountains watershed. As a result of the watershed's integrity and undisturbed natural water filtration system, New York is one of only four major cities in the United States the majority of whose drinking water is pure enough not to require purification by water treatment plants. The Croton Watershed north of the city is undergoing construction of a US$3.2 billion water purification plant to augment New York's water supply by an estimated 290 million gallons daily, representing a greater than 20% addition to the city's current availability of water. The ongoing expansion of New York City Water Tunnel No. 3, an integral part of the New York City water supply system, is the largest capital construction project in the city's history, with segments serving Manhattan and The Bronx completed, and with segments serving Brooklyn and Queens planned for construction in 2020. Much of the fresh water for northern and central New Jersey is provided by reservoirs, but numerous municipal water wells exist which accomplish the same purpose.

Education

The New York metropolitan area is home to many prestigious institutions of higher education. Three Ivy League universities: Columbia University in Manhattan, New York City; Princeton University in Princeton, New Jersey; Yale University in New Haven, Connecticut – all ranked amongst the top 3 U.S. national universities as per U.S. News & World Report as of 2018 – reside in the region, as well as New York University and The Rockefeller University, both located in Manhattan; all of the above have been ranked amongst the top 35 universities in the world. New York Institute of Technology is located on two campuses, one in Old Westbury, Long Island and one near Columbus Circle in Manhattan. Hofstra University is Long Island's largest private university. Fordham University, also a Tier-1 university, is the oldest Catholic institution of higher education in the northeastern United States, and the third-oldest university in New York. The New York City Department of Education is the largest school district in the United States serving over 1.2 million students. The overall region also hosts many public high schools, some of which have been described as among the most prestigious in the country.

Attainment
According to the 2010 American Community Survey, of the 14,973,063 persons in this area over 25 years of age, 14.8% (2,216,578) had a graduate or professional degree, 21.1% (3,166,037) had a bachelor's degree, 6.4% (962,007) had an associate degree, 16.0% (2,393,990) had some college education but no degree, 26.8% (4,009,901) had a high school diploma or equivalent, 14.8% (2,224,557) had less than a high school education. In 2010, CNN Money ranked the area as one of the top 10 smartest regions in the United States.

Transportation

The depth and intricacy of the transportation network in the New York region parallel the size and complexity of the metropolis itself.

In 2013, the New York-Newark-Jersey City metropolitan statistical area (New York MSA) had the lowest percentage of workers who commuted by private automobile (56.9 percent), with 18.9 percent of area workers traveling via rail transit. During the period starting in 2006 and ending in 2013, the New York MSA had a 2.2 percent decline of workers commuting by automobile.

Rail
About one in every three users of mass transit in the United States and two-thirds of the nation's rail riders live in the New York metropolitan area.

New York City Subway

In 2006 it was the third largest when measured by annual ridership (1.5 billion passenger trips in 2006), However, in 2013, the subway delivered over 1.71 billion rides, but slipped to being the seventh busiest rapid transit rail system in the world. New York's subway is also notable because nearly the entire system remains open 24 hours a day, in contrast to the overnight shutdown common to systems in most cities, including Hong Kong, London, Seoul, Tokyo, and Toronto.

PATH

PATH is a rapid transit system connecting the cities of Newark, Harrison, Hoboken, and Jersey City, in metropolitan northern New Jersey, with the lower and midtown sections of Manhattan in New York City. The PATH is operated by the Port Authority of New York and New Jersey. PATH trains run 24 hours a day and 7 days a week.

Commuter rail
The metropolitan area is also fundamentally defined by the areas from which people commute into New York. The city is served by three primary commuter rail systems, and is provided intercity rail transit with Amtrak.

The Long Island Rail Road (LIRR), the busiest commuter railroad in the United States as of 2015, is operated by the Metropolitan Transportation Authority (MTA), an agency of the State Government of New York that focuses on New York City-area transit). It has two major terminals at Pennsylvania Station in Midtown Manhattan and Atlantic Terminal in Downtown Brooklyn, with a minor terminal at the Long Island City station and a major transfer point at the Jamaica station in Queens.

New Jersey Transit (NJT), the second busiest commuter railroad in the United States as of 2015, is operated by the New Jersey Transit Corporation, an agency of the state of New Jersey, in conjunction with Metro-North Railroad and Amtrak. It has major terminals at Pennsylvania Station in Manhattan, Hoboken Terminal, and Newark Pennsylvania Station, with a major transfer point at Secaucus Junction in Hudson County, New Jersey. New Jersey Transit also operates the Hudson–Bergen Light Rail through Hudson County, the Newark City Subway, and the River Line that runs along tracks shared with Conrail Shared Assets Operations from Trenton to Camden in South Jersey. NJ Transit also has commuter buses operating in and out of Manhattan.

Metro-North Railroad (MNRR), the third busiest commuter railroad in the United States as of 2015, is also operated by the MTA, in conjunction with the Connecticut Department of Transportation and New Jersey Transit. Its major terminal is Grand Central Terminal. Trains on the Port Jervis Line and Pascack Valley Line terminate at Hoboken Terminal in Hoboken, New Jersey; commuters may transfer at either Secaucus Junction for New Jersey Transit trains to New York Pennsylvania Station or at Hoboken Terminal for PATH trains into Manhattan.

Amtrak's Northeast Corridor offers service to Philadelphia, New Haven, and other points between and including Boston and Washington, D.C. 
 
Major stations in the metropolitan area include:

The following table shows all train lines operated by these commuter railroads in the New York metropolitan area. New Jersey Transit operates an additional train line in the Philadelphia metropolitan area. (Shown counterclockwise from the Atlantic Ocean):

Major highways
The following highways serve the region:

Interstates

 
 
 
 
 
 
 
  – serves as southern beltway around New York City
 
  – serves as northern beltway around New York City
 
 
  − also known as Long Island Expressway or LIE
 
 
 
  – unsigned

U.S. Routes

State Routes

Other limited-access roads

Some of these roads have a numerical designation assigned to it:
 
 
  (part of I-95)
 
 
 
 
 
 
 
  (formerly: Interboro Parkway)
  (part of Route 15)
  (part of I-95)
  (part of I-87)

Named bridges and tunnels

 Alexander Hamilton Bridge connecting the Trans-Manhattan Expressway in the Washington Heights section of Manhattan and the Cross-Bronx Expressway, as part of Interstate 95
 Basilone Bridge (part of I-95 and the New Jersey Turnpike)
 Bayonne Bridge (part of NY 440 and NJ 440), underwent a $1 billion project to raise the roadway by 64 feet to 215 feet to allow taller container ships to pass underneath to access seaports in New York City and northern New Jersey.
 Bear Mountain Bridge (part of US 6 and US 202)
 Bronx–Whitestone Bridge (part of I-678) – connects the boroughs of Bronx and Queens.
 Brooklyn Bridge, iconic of New York and designated a National Historic Landmark by the U.S. National Park Service on January 29, 1964. Connects Brooklyn and lower Manhattan (at Park Row and City Hall).
 Brooklyn–Battery Tunnel (part of I-478), officially renamed the Hugh L. Carey Tunnel, in honor of the former New York State governor – connects Brooklyn and lower Manhattan (financial district).
 Delaware Water Gap Toll Bridge (part of I-80 crossing the Delaware River)
 Driscoll Bridge (part of the Garden State Parkway), with a total of 15 travel lanes and 6 shoulder lanes, the widest motor vehicle bridge in the world by number of lanes and one of the world's busiest.
 Ed Koch Queensboro Bridge (part of NY 25) – renamed in honor of former New York Mayor Edward I. Koch, also known informally as the "59th Street Bridge". Connects Queens and east side of Manhattan.
 George Washington Bridge (part of I-95 and US 1-9/46), the world's busiest motor vehicle bridge and one of the world's widest, with 14 lanes.
 Goethals Bridge (part of I-278)
 Great South Bay Bridge, Long Island
 Heroes Tunnel (formerly the West Rock Tunnel) (part of CT 15)
 Holland Tunnel (part of I-78 and NJ 139)
 Lincoln Tunnel (part of Route 495)
 Mid-Hudson Bridge (part of US 44 and NY 55)
 Newark Bay Bridge (part of I-78)
 New Hope – Lambertville Toll Bridge (part of US 202 crossing the Delaware River)
 Newburgh–Beacon Bridge (part of I-84 and NY 52)
 Otisville Tunnel (takes the Metro-North Railroad Port Jervis Line through the Shawangunk Ridge in Orange County, New York)
 Outerbridge Crossing (part of NY 440 and NJ 440)
 Pearl Harbor Memorial Bridge (part of I-95 and the Connecticut Turnpike)
 Poughkeepsie Bridge, also known as Walkway over the Hudson, the world's longest pedestrian bridge, connecting Ulster and Dutchess counties in New York 
 Pulaski Skyway (part of US 1–9)
 Queens–Midtown Tunnel (part of I-495) – connects Queens and Midtown Manhattan.
 Scudder Falls Bridge (part of I-295 crossing the Delaware River)
 Sikorsky Memorial Bridge (part of CT 15 Merritt & Wilbur Cross Parkways)
 Tappan Zee Bridge (part of I-87, I-287, and the New York State Thruway), the longest bridge in New York State; underwent a $4 billion replacement.
 Thomas Alva Edison Memorial Bridge (part of US 9)
 Throgs Neck Bridge (part of I-295) – connects the boroughs of Bronx and Queens (at western end of Long Island Sound).
 Trenton–Morrisville Toll Bridge (part of US 1)
 Triborough Bridge (part of I-278), officially renamed the Robert F. Kennedy (RFK) Bridge – connects the three boroughs of Manhattan, Bronx and Queens (hence its name).
 Verrazzano-Narrows Bridge (part of I-278), the longest suspension bridge in the Americas and one of the longest in the world (formerly the world's longest) – connects the boroughs of Staten Island and Brooklyn.
 William A. Stickel Memorial Bridge (part of I-280)

Commuter bus
New Jersey Transit, Academy Bus, Coach USA, Spanish Transportation, Trailways of New York, and several other companies operate commuter coaches into the Port Authority Bus Terminal in Manhattan, and many other bus services in New Jersey. Bus services also operate in other nearby counties in the states of New York and Connecticut, but most terminate at a subway terminal or other rail station.

Major airports

The three busiest airports in the New York metropolitan area include John F. Kennedy International Airport, Newark Liberty International Airport, and LaGuardia Airport; 130.5 million travelers used these three airports in 2016, and the metropolitan area's airspace is the busiest in the nation.

The following smaller airports are also in the metro area and provide daily commercial service:

Commuter usage
According to the 2010 American Community Survey, 54.3% (5,476,169) of commuters used a car or other private vehicle alone, 7.0% (708,788) used a carpool, 27.0% (2,721,372) used public transportation, 5.5% (558,434) walked to work, 2.0% (200,448) used some other means of transportation such as a bicycle to get to work.

Culture and contemporary life

New York has been described as the cultural capital of the world by the diplomatic consulates of Iceland and Latvia and by New York's own Baruch College. A book containing a series of essays titled New York, culture capital of the world, 1940–1965 has also been published as showcased by the National Library of Australia. Tom Wolfe has quoted regarding New York's culture that "Culture just seems to be in the air, like part of the weather."

Although Manhattan remains the epicenter of cultural life in the metropolitan area, the entire region is replete with prominent cultural institutions, with artistic performances and ethnically oriented events receiving international attention throughout the year.

Sports teams

New York is home to the headquarters of the National Football League, Major League Baseball, the National Basketball Association, the National Hockey League, and Major League Soccer. Four of the ten most expensive stadiums ever built worldwide (MetLife Stadium, the new Yankee Stadium, Madison Square Garden, and Citi Field) are located in the New York metropolitan area. The New York metropolitan area has the highest total number of professional sports teams in these five leagues.

Listing of the professional sports teams in the New York metropolitan area:
 National Basketball Association (NBA)
 Brooklyn Nets (Brooklyn, New York City)
 New York Knicks (Manhattan, New York City)
National Women's Soccer League (NWSL)
NJ/NY Gotham FC (Harrison, New Jersey)
 Women's National Basketball Association (WNBA)
 New York Liberty (Brooklyn, New York City)
 Major League Baseball (MLB)
 New York Mets (Queens, New York City)
 New York Yankees (The Bronx, New York City)
 Major League Soccer (MLS)
 New York City FC (The Bronx, New York City)
 New York Red Bulls (Harrison, New Jersey)
 Minor League Baseball (MiLB)
 Eastern League (AA)
 Trenton Thunder (Yankees) (Trenton, New Jersey)
 South Atlantic League (A)
 Lakewood BlueClaws (Phillies) (Lakewood Township, New Jersey)
 Brooklyn Cyclones (Mets) (Brooklyn, New York City)
 Hudson Valley Renegades (Rays) (Fishkill, New York)

 Atlantic League of Professional Baseball (ALPB)
 Staten Island FerryHawks (Staten Island, New York City)
 Bridgeport Bluefish (Bridgeport, Connecticut)
 Long Island Ducks (Central Islip, New York)
 Somerset Patriots (Bridgewater Township, New Jersey
 Canadian American Association of Professional Baseball (CanAm League)
 New Jersey Jackals (Little Falls, New Jersey)
 Newark Bears (Newark, New Jersey)
 Rockland Boulders (Pomona, New York)
 National Football League (NFL)
 New York Giants (East Rutherford, New Jersey)
 New York Jets (East Rutherford, New Jersey)
 National Hockey League (NHL)
 New Jersey Devils (Newark, New Jersey)
 New York Islanders (Elmont, New York)
 New York Rangers (Manhattan, New York City)
 American Hockey League (AHL)
 Bridgeport Sound Tigers (Islanders) (Bridgeport, Connecticut)
 Major League Lacrosse (outdoor) (MLL)
 New York Lizards (Hempstead, New York)
 North American Rugby League (NARL)
 New York City Rugby League (Harrison, New Jersey)
 College Sports (NCAA Division I)
 Army Black Knights (West Point, New York)
 Columbia University Lions (Manhattan, New York City)
 Fairfield University Stags (Fairfield, Connecticut)
 Fairleigh Dickinson University Knights (Teaneck, New Jersey)
 Fordham University Rams (The Bronx, New York City)
 Hofstra University Pride (Hempstead, New York)
 Iona College Gaels (New Rochelle, New York)
 Long Island University Blackbirds (Brooklyn, New York City)
 Manhattan College Jaspers and Lady Jaspers (The Bronx, New York City)
 Marist College Red Foxes (Poughkeepsie, New York)
 Monmouth University Hawks (West Long Branch, New Jersey)
 New Jersey Institute of Technology Highlanders (Newark, New Jersey)
 Princeton University Tigers (Princeton, New Jersey)
 Quinnipiac University Bobcats (Hamden, Connecticut)
 Rider University Broncs (Lawrenceville, New Jersey)
 Rutgers University Scarlet Knights (New Brunswick, New Jersey)
 Sacred Heart University Pioneers (Fairfield, Connecticut)
 St. Peter's University Peacocks and Peahens (Jersey City, New Jersey)
 St. Francis Brooklyn Terriers (Brooklyn, New York City)
 St. John's University Red Storm (Queens, New York City)
 Seton Hall University Pirates (South Orange, New Jersey)
 Stony Brook University Seawolves (Stony Brook, New York)
 Wagner College Seahawks (Staten Island, New York City)
 Yale University Bulldogs (New Haven, Connecticut)

Media 

The New York metropolitan area is home to the headquarters of several well-known media companies, subsidiaries, and publications, including Thomson Reuters, The New York Times Company, the Associated Press, Warner Bros. Discovery, NBCUniversal, the Hearst Corporation, Paramount Global, News Corp, the Fox Corporation, The Wall Street Journal, Fox News, ABC, CBS, and NBC. Local television channels broadcasting to the New York market include WCBS-TV 2 (CBS), WNBC 4 (NBC), WNYW 5 (FOX), WABC-TV 7 (ABC), WWOR-TV 9 (MyNetworkTV), WPIX 11 (CW), WNET 13 (PBS), WNYE-TV 25 (NYC Media) and WPXN-TV 31 (Ion). NY1 is a 24/7 local news provider available only to cable television subscribers. Radio stations serving the area include: WNYC, WKCR, WFMU, WABC-AM, and WFAN. Many television and radio stations use the top of the Empire State Building to broadcast their terrestrial television signals, while some media entities broadcast from studios in Times Square.

The New York metropolitan area is extensive enough so that its own channels must compete with channels from neighboring television markets (including Philadelphia, Scranton/Wilkes-Barre, and Hartford) within its outlying counties. Cable companies offer such competition in the Pennsylvania portion, Connecticut, and a few counties in central New Jersey.

Theme parks

In New Jersey

In New York State
Coney Island, in Brooklyn, is considered one of America's first amusement parks.

Playland, Rye, Westchester County

Legoland New York, in Goshen, Orange County opened in 2021.

Plans were unveiled by New York Mayor Michael Bloomberg on September 27, 2012, for the New York Wheel, a giant Ferris wheel, to be built at the northern shore of Staten Island, overlooking the Statue of Liberty, New York Harbor, and the Lower Manhattan skyline.

Area codes
The area is served by at least 26 area codes:

 212: Serves Manhattan and is overlaid with 646 and 917 332.
 718: Serves all other boroughs of New York City and is overlaid with 347, 917, and 929.
 917: Serves all of New York City.
 516: Serves Nassau County.
 631: Serves Suffolk County.
 914: Serves Westchester County.
 845: Serves the Hudson Valley counties of Southern New York State.
 570 & 272: Serves Pike County in Pennsylvania.
 203 & 475: Serves Southwestern Connecticut,
 860 & 959: Serves the rest of Connecticut not served by 203 or 475.
 201: Serves most of Bergen County, as well as parts of Essex, Hudson, and Passaic in Northern New Jersey, and is overlaid with 551.
 973: Serves portions of Bergen, Essex, Hudson, Morris, Passaic, Sussex, and portions of Union County in New Jersey, and is overlaid with 862.
 908: Serves communities in Union County, Somerset County, northern parts of Middlesex County, Hunterdon County, Warren County, and Morris County as well as some cell phones in Monmouth County in New Jersey.
 732: Serves Middlesex County, Somerset County, portions of Union County, and Monmouth and northern Ocean counties in New Jersey; overlaid with 848.
 609 & 640: Serves Mercer County and parts of Middlesex, Monmouth, and Ocean Counties.

See also
 Biotech companies in the New York City metropolitan region
 Tech companies in the New York metropolitan area
 Cities and metropolitan areas of the United States
 Mass transit in New York City
 Regional Plan Association
 Transportation in New York City

Notes

References

External links

 Government Census, Table 1.

 
Northeast megalopolis
Metropolitan areas of New Jersey
Metropolitan areas of New York (state)
Metropolitan areas of Pennsylvania
Metropolitan areas of Connecticut
Regions of New York (state)
Regions of New Jersey
Regions of Connecticut
Regions of Pennsylvania